Kala Afghana is a village in Batala tehsil located in Gurdaspur district of Punjab State, India. The village is administrated by Sarpanch an elected representative of the village.

Demography 
, The village has 979 houses and the population of 4944, of which 2589 are males and 2355 are females.  According to the report published by Census India in 2011, out of the total population of the village 377 people are from Schedule Caste and the village does not have any Schedule Tribe population so far.

See also
List of villages in India

References

External links 
 Tourism of Punjab
 Census of Punjab

Villages in Gurdaspur district